The 2022 Ball Hockey World Championship was the 14th ball hockey world championship, and was held in Laval, Canada. The tournament began on 21 June 2022, with the gold medal game held on 27 June 2022.

Venue

Participants
Group A

 Slovakia
 Czech Republic
 Italy
 Haiti
 Great Britain

Group B

 Canada
 Greece
 Armenia
 USA
 Finland

Women's

 Czech Republic
 USA
 Canada
 Slovakia
 Great Britain
 Lebanon

References

Ball Hockey World Championship
International sports competitions hosted by Canada
Sport in Laval, Quebec
June 2022 sports events in Canada